The American Film Foundation is a production company based in Southern California. The foundation is headed by Terry Sanders and Freida Lee Mock who have combined to create more than 60 documentary and feature films.

They have won multiple awards for films like Maya Lin: A Strong Clear Vision, A Time Out of War and Lillian Gish: An Actor's Life for Me.

Both Sanders and Mock have dedicated the mission of their foundation to the production of films that honor the arts, humanities, and sciences.

Selected filmography

 Maya Lin: A Strong Clear Vision
 Never Give Up: The 20th Century Odyssey of Herbert Zipper
 Rose Kennedy: A Life to Remember, Narrated by Edward Kennedy
 Screenwriters: Words Into Image
 Sing!
 A Time Out of War
 War Hunt

External links
 American Film Foundation

Film production companies of the United States